McDermid is a Scottish surname, and may refer to:

Bob McDermid, Scottish football player.
John McDermid, Canadian Politician.
Val McDermid, Scottish crime writer.
Sally McDermid, Australian softball player.
Eric McDermid, Canadian Bald Monkey

See also 

 McDiarmid, an Irish surname
 MacDermot, an Irish Gaelic family

Surnames
Surnames of Scottish origin
Anglicised Scottish Gaelic-language surnames
Scottish surnames
Surnames of British Isles origin